Jack Cleary (28 August 1911 – 14 February 1995) was an  Australian rules footballer who played with Fitzroy in the Victorian Football League (VFL).

Notes

External links 
		

1911 births
1995 deaths
Australian rules footballers from Victoria (Australia)
Fitzroy Football Club players